Hermann Josef Buchkremer (11 May 1940) is a German physicist and former Rector of the FH Aachen University of Applied Sciences.

Life and work 
After completing school, Hermann Josef Buchkremer studied physics at the University of Cologne and the RWTH Aachen. After receiving his Diplom, he worked as a research associate at the Highway Research Institute of the RWTH Aachen, then at the Institute for Reactor Safety at the Jülich Research Centre.

After the founding of the FH Aachen University of Applied Sciences with Jülich Campus, Buchkremer started as a lecturer in physical engineering, neutron physics and atomic physics and was appointed professor several years later. Starting in 1974 he also taught the general education subjects.  In 1968 Buchkremer was elected Speaker for the Campus Jülich. In 1991 he was elected Rector of the FH Aachen University of Applied Sciences, where he remained until his retirement in 2005.

One of Buchkremer's greatest achievements at the FH Aachen University of Applied Sciences was the establishment of the Freshman Institute, which as the foundation year Studienkolleg for international students is a technical and linguistic bridge between school in the home country and study in Germany, and therefore, an optimal entry to studying in Germany .

Buchkremer was appointed Honorary Senator of the FH Aachen University of Applied Sciences in 2010 for his contributions to the university.

References

External links 
 Prof. Hermann Josef Buchkremer wird 75 Jahre alt, in Aachener Zeitung vom 8. Mai 2015
 Fachhochschul-Rektor Prof. Hermann Josef Buchkremer geht in den Ruhestand, im Magazin der Fachhochschule Aachen vom Februar 2005.

1940 births
20th-century German physicists
Academic staff of FH Aachen
University of Cologne alumni
RWTH Aachen University alumni
Place of birth missing (living people)
Living people